The Diocese of Orlando is a Latin Church ecclesiastical territory or diocese of the Catholic Church in Florida. It encompasses about  spanning Orange, Osceola, Seminole, Marion, Lake, Volusia, Brevard, Polk, and Sumter Counties in the state of Florida.  In 2010, the diocese contained 81 parishes, 10 missions, and 37 schools. St. James Cathedral serves as the seat of the diocese. Within the diocese are two minor basilicas, Mary, Queen of the Universe Shrine, a basilica which ministers to Catholic tourists, and St. Paul's in Daytona Beach.

In 2011, the estimated population was about 400,923 Catholics. There are 208 priests, 87 religious nuns, and 181 permanent deacons. Twenty-six men are studying for the priesthood.

The current bishop is John Gerard Noonan. He took over effective October 24, 2010, having served previously as an Auxiliary Bishop of Miami, after the previous Bishop of Orlando, Thomas Wenski, was ordained to Archbishop of Miami. The Diocese of Orlando is a suffragan diocese in the ecclesiastical province of the metropolitan Archdiocese of Miami.

History

Pope Paul VI erected the Diocese of Orlando on June 18, 1968, taking its present territory from the Diocese of St. Augustine and making it a suffragan of the Metropolitan Archdiocese of Miami.

In the 1970's, it became apparent that there was a need for ministerial outreach to tourists visiting Walt Disney World and the Lake Buena Vista Resort.  The diocese responded first by establishing a parish in the Lake Buena Vista area, and subsequently by building the Shrine of Mary, Queen of the Universe, located off of International Drive in the heart of the tourist and convention area to the southwest of the Orlando's urban center, which has seen subsequent development of many additional convention centers and attractions.  The United States Conference of Catholic Bishops designated the present shrine church, dedicated in 1993, as a national shrine in 2004 and Pope Benedict XVI designated it as a minor basilica on 22 August 2009.

Bishops

Bishops of Orlando
 William Donald Borders (1968-1974), appointed Archbishop of Baltimore
 Thomas Joseph Grady (1974-1989)
 Norbert Dorsey (1990-2004)
 Thomas Wenski (2004-2010), appointed Archbishop of Miami
 John Gerard Noonan (2010–present)

Other priests of this diocese who became bishops
 Gregory Lawrence Parkes, appointed Bishop of Pensacola-Tallahassee in 2012
 Stephen Douglas Parkes, appointed Bishop of Savannah in 2020

Present administration
For administrative purposes, the diocese has five deaneries centered in the following towns: 
 Eastern Deanery (Volusia County) - Daytona Beach
 Southern Deanery (Brevard County) – Melbourne. In 2009, there were approximately 80,000 Catholics in Brevard.
 Northern Deanery (Marion, Sumter, and Lake Counties) – The Villages
 Western Deanery (Polk County) – Lakeland
 Central Deanery (Osceola, Orange, Seminole Counties) – Orlando

The diocese operates the San Pedro Center for the benefit of over 10,000 retreatants during 2008.

Diocese administration contains the following organizations: Office of Communication, Office of Advocacy and Justice, Office of Hispanic Ministry, Office of Family Life and Pastoral Care, Campus Ministry, Office of Finance and Accounting, Office of Human Resources, Buena Nueva FM 104.1, El Clarin, The Florida Catholic, IT, Media Center, Youth/Young Adults, Catholic Charities of Central Florida (including Pathways to Care), Bishop Grady Villas, Tourism Ministries, Mission Office, Propagation of the Faithm and Farmworker Ministry.

The diocese raised $10 million from its parishes in 2007 to support its ministries.

Ministries
1,342 couples participated in the marriage program under the Family Life Office in 2007.

In the diocese, 1,000 people were prepared and entered the church in 2008.

Over 900 people are trained to minister to the sick as of 2007.

The diocese has a sister diocese in the Dominican Republic. Missioners built two churches and one community center. The medical mission helped 2,000 patients in 2007.

The diocese has unique services for the large number of tourists who visit the area. Mary, Queen of the Universe Shrine was opened in 1979 near Walt Disney World to provide a location for mass for Orlando-area tourists. An Apostleship of the Sea ministry is located at the Stella Maris Center at Port Canaveral for the benefit of seafarers.

Catholic charities
In 2007, Catholic charities gave food and financial assistance to 23,000 families; helped over 290 refugee families and 4,000 people with immigration issues; and visited 2,000 prisoners. Pathways to Care assisted 290 homeless people with medical and shelter.

Other diocesan ministries
Catholic Cemeteries of Central Florida is the Diocesan Ministry that helps to oversee the three parish cemeteries at All Souls Catholic Cemetery, St. Joseph Catholic Cemetery, and St. Matthew Catholic Cemetery. 
Council of Catholic Women. In 2008, there were 32 such parish groups in the diocese. In 2007, they donated $240,759 to charitable causes and recorded an estimated 130,615 volunteer hours.

Education
In 2007 there were 12,116 elementary, and 2,687 high school students enrolled in the Diocesan Catholic schools. There were 816 elementary and 221 high school teachers in the Catholic School District. The Diocese supports the Catholic Campus Ministry at the neighboring University of Central Florida.

Within the diocese more than 29,000 young students are educated in religion by 4,069 catechists and religious educators.

The Superintendent of Schools was Henry Fortier.

In 2011, there were 14,500 students in the 38 schools in the diocesan school system. This includes 32 elementary schools, 5 high schools and one special education school.

In 2008, the National Catholic Educational Association recognized the diocesan school board as "outstanding", the only diocesan board to be so recognized. At the same time, the Father Lopez Catholic High School Board was simultaneously recognized as outstanding; also the only school board to be so designated.

In 2009-2010, the diocesan schools received more than $1 million in Title I and Title II funds through the federal government.

Secondary schools

The average tuition at diocesan high schools for 2007-8 was $7,476 annually. The average annual cost to educate each student was $10,297. There are five secondary schools:
 Bishop Moore High School, Orlando
 Father Lopez Catholic High School, Daytona Beach
 Melbourne Central Catholic High School, Melbourne
 Santa Fe Catholic High School, Lakeland
 Trinity Catholic High School, Ocala

Elementary schools

The average tuition for diocesan elementary schools in 2007–08 was $4,162. The actual average cost of educating each student was $5,610. The Diocese of Orlando had 32 elementary schools in 2011. Since 1985, 18 of those have been awarded the designation of National Blue Ribbon School of Excellence.

Brevard County
 Ascension Catholic School, Melbourne, 2003 and 1985 National Blue Ribbon School
 Divine Mercy Catholic School, Merritt Island, 2004 National Blue Ribbon School
 Holy Name of Jesus Catholic School, Indialantic, 2003 and 2000 National Blue Ribbon School
 Our Lady of Lourdes Catholic School, Melbourne
 Our Saviour Catholic School, Cocoa Beach, 2004 National Blue Ribbon School
 St. Joseph Parish School, Palm Bay, 2006 and 1993 National Blue Ribbon School
 St. Mary Catholic School, Rockledge, 2004 National Blue Ribbon School
 St. Teresa Catholic School, Titusville

Lake County
 St. Paul Catholic School, Leesburg

Marion County
 Blessed Trinity Catholic School, Ocala

Orange County
 Good Shepherd Catholic School, Orlando, 2000 National Blue Ribbon School
 Holy Family Catholic School, Orlando, 2006 National Blue Ribbon School
 St. Andrew Catholic School, Orlando, 2009 National Blue Ribbon School
 St. Charles Borromeo Catholic School, Orlando, 2007 National Blue Ribbon School
 St. James Cathedral School, Orlando, 2005 National Blue Ribbon School
 St. John Vianney Catholic School, Orlando, 2005 National Blue Ribbon School
 St. Margaret Mary Catholic School, Winter Park, 2006 National Blue Ribbon School

Osceola County
 Holy Redeemer Catholic School, Kissimmee
 St. Thomas Aquinas Catholic School, St. Cloud

Polk County
 Resurrection Catholic School, Lakeland, 2004 National Blue Ribbon School
 St. Anthony Catholic School, Lakeland
 St. Joseph Catholic Academy, Lakeland
 St. Joseph Catholic School, Winter Haven

Seminole County
 All Souls Catholic School, Sanford, 2004 National Blue Ribbon School
 Annunciation Catholic Academy, Altamonte Springs, 2003 National Blue Ribbon School
 St. Mary Magdalen Catholic School, Altamonte Springs, 2006 National Blue Ribbon School

Volusia County
 Basilica School of St. Paul, Daytona Beach
 Lourdes Academy, Daytona Beach, 2006 National Blue Ribbon School
 Sacred Heart Catholic School, New Smyrna Beach, 2008 National Blue Ribbon School
 St. Brendan Catholic School, Ormond Beach
 St. Peter Catholic School, DeLand

Special education

 Morning Star School, Orlando

History

Hernando de Soto explored Florida in 1539. The Timucua and the Ais Indians around Cape Canaveral were hostile to the Spaniards and allowed no mission centers.

Florida was first part of the Church of Havana, Cuba, as early as 1606. Bishops of Santiago de Cuba ministered to Catholics in Florida until 1763, when England acquired Florida from Spain. The first mass migration to the New World took place when hundreds of Catholics from Menorca settled in New Smyrna in 1768. They were members there of San Pedro Church until they abandoned that Atlantic coastal site in 1777 and moved north to St. Augustine. Cuban bishops resumed control after Florida was returned to Spain in 1783.

In 1858, Bishop Augustin Verot became Vicar Apostolic of part of Georgia and all of Florida. He became Bishop of Savannah in 1861 and remained Vicar Apostolic of Florida.

In 1870, the Diocese of St. Augustine, including all of Florida, was formed with Verot its first bishop.

The Diocese of Orlando was established on June 18, 1968.  Prior to that time, Central Florida was part of the Diocese of St. Augustine. At its formation, the new diocese consisted of fifty parishes and served 128,000 Catholics.  Because of the growth of the Orlando metropolitan area, engendered by the opening of  Disney World and other tourist destinations, the diocese became one of the fastest growing ones in the nation.  It 2007 it included 73 parishes, 10 missions, and 37 schools spread over the nine counties of Orange, Osceola, Seminole, Marion, Lake, Volusia, Brevard, Polk, and Sumter.  It serves a population of approximately 350,000 Catholics.  The patroness of the Diocese of Orlando is Mary, the Mother of God.

Orlando's first bishop was William D. Borders who was installed on June 14, 1968.  Border's achievements included establishing parish councils, parish education boards, participation of the laity as extraordinary ministers of the Eucharist, a Sisters' Council, a migrant ministry apostolate staffed by full-time personnel, and a campus ministry program which was acclaimed nationally. Diocesan Catholic communities became integrated in the late 1960s and early 1970s.

Thomas J. Grady was installed as bishop on December 16, 1974.  He ran the diocese during a period of growth.  He established eighteen new parishes, a tourism ministry, San Pedro Center (a centrally-located spiritual life center), and a sister diocese in the Dominican Republic. He also encouraged the greater participation of women in the work of the Church.  At the end of his tenure in 1990, the Catholic population of the diocese had grown over 76% and the number of parishes had increased by more than a third.

When the Diocese of Orlando was founded, St. Charles Borromeo Church in the College Park neighborhood of Orlando was designated the diocesan Cathedral. On October 1, 1976, the cathedral was destroyed by an electrical fire. On March 25, 1977, St. James Church in downtown Orlando became the new Cathedral.

Norbert M. Dorsey, was installed as bishop on May 25, 1990. The diocese added parishes and schools, as well as expanded the ministry to the growing Hispanic community through establishing Radio Paz and health clinics for migrant and farm workers.  Mary, Queen of the Universe Shrine was established as a church, built in the midst of the tourist area, for visitors to attend Mass and pray. Bishop Grady Villas, which opened on January 1, 2004, was constructed as a residential community for adults with intellectual and developmental disabilities. A cemetery at San Pedro Retreat Center for priests of the diocese was established.

On July 1, 2003, Pope John Paul II appointed Thomas G. Wenski as Coadjutor Bishop of the Diocese of Orlando. On November 13, 2004, Bishop Wenski succeeded Bishop Dorsey, becoming the fourth Bishop of Orlando.

From 2004-10, six new parishes and two missions were created. A capital and endowment campaign raised $100 million. Two diocesan churches were raised to the status of minor basilicas. The Spanish-language radio station Buena Nueva FM was started  along with the Spanish-language newspaper, El Clarin.

The United States Conference of Catholic Bishops held their spring convocation in the diocese in 2008.

On April 20, 2010, Bishop Thomas G. Wenski was appointed Metropolitan Archbishop of the Archdiocese of Miami by Pope Benedict XVI. On June 3, 2010, the College of Consultors met and elected Father Richard Walsh, pastor of St. Margaret Mary Parish in Winter Park, as the Diocesan Administrator, who served in that capacity until the new bishop was appointed in October.

On October 23, 2010, Benedict XVI appointed Bishop John Gerard Noonan, as the fifth bishop of the Diocese of Orlando.

The bishops of the diocese are:

William Donald Borders (1968–1974)
Thomas Joseph Grady (1974–1989)
Norbert Mary Leonard James Dorsey (1990–2004)
Thomas Gerard Wenski (2004–2010)
John Gerard Noonan (2010–current)

Gregory Parkes, a priest of this diocese, was appointed Bishop of Pensacola-Tallahassee in 2012. later in 2017, he was appointed Bishop of Saint Petersburg.

Reports of sex abuse
In 1995, the Diocese of Orlando issued lawsuit settlements with people who accused two Catholic clergy of sexually abusing them. The same year, priest Orlando priest Thomas Ragni was arrested and charged with sexually abusing young people at his seminary. He was then convicted in 1996 and sentenced to ten years in prison, but was released early in 2000. In 2004, 12 priests who were accused of committing sex abuse while serving in the Diocese of Orlando were removed from active ministry. In August 2018, the Diocese was also revealed to have harbored a priest who was accused of committing sex abuse while serving in the Diocese of Allentown in Pennsylvania. The accused Pennsylvania priest was soon removed from ministry.

Parishes

There are 93 parishes in the Diocese of Orlando.

Parishes include:

All Souls, Sanford - 1,776 registered families; average attendance 1,700 each weekend.
Corpus Christi, Celebration - 920 registered families; average attendance 1,700 each weekend.
St. Philip Phan van Minh, Orlando - a language parish for people of Vietnamese descent
Most Precious Blood, Oviedo - 1,900 registered families; 2,200 average weekend attendance
St. Mark the Evangelist, Summerfield - 2,067  families registered.
St. Faustina, Clermont - 700 registered families, over 500 attending each weekend.
St. Mary, Rockledge.  A parish of 1400 families.  In 2002 the congregation opened an ultra modern church designed by  architect Michael Graves.  The church is set up in such a way as to show the journey of life towards Christ that one makes.

Basilicas
Basilica of St. Paul - Pope Benedict XVI raised St. Paul's Church in Daytona Beach to a Minor Basilica in 2006.
Basilica of Mary, Queen of the Universe - Pope Benedict XVI raised Mary, Queen of the Universe Shrine in Orlando to a Minor Basilica in 2009.

Other
 St. Jude Maronite Church is a Catholic church in Orlando under the jurisdiction of the Maronite Catholic Eparchy of Saint Maron of Brooklyn (Maronite Catholic Church).
Immaculate Heart of Mary's Hermitage West Melbourne  is a Roman Catholic Hermitage that moved to West Melbourne in 2005 upon completion of the Oratory from Eau Gallie. Hermitage continues to receive its sacramental support from Ascension Catholic Community

Media
The diocese owns the Spanish-language radio station Buena Nueva FM 104.1 Sub-Carrier which reaches eight counties of the nine comprising the diocese. It is broadcast on the internet.

Newspaper

A localized version of the Florida Catholic newspaper is published 38 times a year. Diocesan circulation is 40,200, the highest in the Eccesiastical Province of Miami.

See also

 Catholic Church by country
 Catholic Church hierarchy
 List of the Catholic dioceses of the United States

Notes

References

External links

Roman Catholic Diocese of Orlando Official Site
Immaculate Heart of Mary's Hermitage, West Melbourne
Simulcast of Buena Nueva 104.1 FM 

 
Christianity in Orlando, Florida
Christian organizations established in 1968
Orlando
Orlando
1968 establishments in Florida